Jamaica College (abbreviated J.C. or JC) is a public, Christian, secondary school and sixth form for boys in Kingston, Jamaica. It was established in 1789 by Charles Drax, who was the grand-nephew of wealthy Barbadian sugar planter James Drax.

It provides traditional classroom education to its students in a variety of subject areas and caters to students aged 10 to 19 years. First established as a boarding school for boys, it has remained a single-sex school with the boarding facilities removed, but later re-opened in 2016.

During the 18th century when Jamaica prospered as a sugar colony of the British Empire, several large donations were made by wealthy slave owners for the funding of schools. The objective of these bequests was usually to provide free education for the poor of the parish to which the benefactor belonged. Jamaica College is a product of such a bequest. The school is widely known for both its academic and sports achievements, and has produced many influential members of Jamaican society.

History

Drax Free School
Jamaica College was founded in 1789, making it the sixth oldest continually running high school in the country, after Wolmer's Boys', one of the Wolmer's Schools (1729), Manning's School (1738), St. Jago High School (1744), Rusea's High School (1777) and Titchfield High School (1786). It was first known as the Drax Free School in the parish of St. Ann, and was founded by Charles Drax, a planter of that parish, who was originally from Twickenham, England. Drax came to Jamaica from Barbados, and as a white slave-owning planter, he was elected the representative of St Ann in 1702, the now-defunct parish of St David in 1707, Saint Mary Parish, Jamaica in 1708, the now-defunct parish of St George in 1710, and the parish of Saint James Parish, Jamaica in 1719. He died in 1721, and his estate was valued at nearly £9,000, including 307 slaves, of which 167 were male and 140 female.

Drax left money in his will to establish a charity school in St. Ann. The school was intended for the education of eight boys and four girls, most of whom were white and poor. The will stipulated that two female black slaves on the Drax Hall estate would be used to keep the school "clean and neat". The will stipulated that the children were to be taught "reading, writing and arithmetick".

There was some delay and legal proceedings before the money was handed over to the St. Ann vestry. With no one to probate the Drax will, and with the theft of some of the money, Jamaica College in its original form did not start until 1795. Then it was decided that Jamaica College would be a high school and an outpost of the University of London. It was in 1802 that the sum of £5,200 (JA$10,400 at the time), was applied by an Act of the Legislature to the endowment of the school.

Jamaica Free School
The Jamaica Free School was established at Walton, near Moneague, in the parish of St. Ann. The property at Walton Pen was bought for the site of the school, purchased in 1806. A year later, another Act of Legislature gave the school the name, Jamaica Free School. Both the names Drax Free School and Jamaica Free School had nothing to do with the concept of free tuition for attendees, but meant that the school was for the children of free people, both white and free black and mixed race. The Free School was not intended for black slaves, though his will did make an exception for his "slave Robinson", who was to be admitted and "placed out as one of them". The Free School was typical of a number of institutions set up during that era.

Jamaica High School
The school had its name changed 73 years later. In 1879, during the governorship of Sir Anthony Musgrave, a provision was made by law for the Jamaica Free School to come under the jurisdiction of the Jamaica School Commission. The institution was now to be known under a new name, Jamaica High School. All classes at the time were free so there was no longer a need to call the school Jamaica Free School, but the purpose of the school remained the same until 1903. This law also authorized the removal of the school from Walton Pen in St. Ann in 1883, and classes were conducted at Barbican Great House until mid-1885. The school then had a new headmaster, Reverend (later Archdeacon) William Simms.

The buildings on Old Hope Road were opened on 9 July 1885, by the then Governor of Jamaica, Sir Henry Wylie Norman, and the first classes took place in September of the same year. In September 1890, a college was opened in connection with the school, known as University College. The site at Old Hope Road was also the tropical outpost of the University of London. It was therefore decided that the purpose of the school would be to give secondary preparation to potential students of the University of London who happened to reside in Jamaica. The name revision reflected this change, which became the school's second purpose. Until 1902 there were two separate names for the school's units. Subsequently, Jamaica High School and University College were amalgamated under the name Jamaica College. Therefore, during its history, the school has changed both name and location four times.

Jamaica College
Given that the sole purpose of Jamaica College from 1903 onwards was to train potential university students in the days when the University of the West Indies did not exist, in practice most students did not go further than fourth or fifth forms. That was considered sufficient education for just about any managerial or clerical job in Jamaica. It was also considered uneconomical to run a school of less than eighty boys, and therefore a deliberate attempt to expand the school to include those of parents who were able to afford the fees was embarked upon. By the 1930s, the student population rose to over one hundred and fifty.

In 1957, the elected government of the day introduced a system of Common Entrance to all High Schools in Jamaica. After some amount of initial resistance by the school board, Jamaica College, previously accessible only to the elite and a few academically extraordinary boys who won government scholarships, was opened up to the masses of Jamaica. The school now provided one of several outlets for secondary education in Jamaica.

Jamaica College developed as a boarding institution until 1967, when that system was removed. Up to that period, the school population was primarily composed of boys from affluent families and heritage. Today, as a day school, it comprises students from a wide cross-section of the community. Its Old Boys continue to play important roles in the religious, political, business and professional services, of Jamaica.

Notably, in 2011, Jamaica College was awarded to be the most innovative high school in Jamaica which is a reflection of the many achievements and special development programmes that have been implemented at the institution in recent times.

The award was received through the Unearthing Innovations Project education competition.

Jamaica College Museum
To continue preserving the rich history of Jamaica College, a museum has been established on the grounds of the institution. The museum boasts scores of poster boards, which chronicle the history of the school, and secondary education in the country in a systematic and comprehensive manner. The museum also boasts several video screens, which will allow users to find the articles they need speedily. Photographs of original buildings of the institution, as well as schoolboys enjoying or participating in various sporting disciplines are also on display in the facility.

Campus
The Jamaica College campus is currently owned by the Jamaica College Trust who is currently chaired by Mr. Derek Jones.

The campus of Jamaica College was selected as the site for a new outdoor electrical lighting pilot project being led by the Petroleum Corporation of Jamaica in the organisation's efforts to promote renewable energy sources.

Historic buildings
Since 19 June 2000, four buildings on the campus have been declared National Heritage Sites by the Jamaica National Heritage Trust.

Simms building

Built in 1885 of masonry and timber, the Simms building exhibits a combination of Gothic and Georgian features; the projecting central tower and wings are reminiscent of Georgian designs, while the façade's soaring verticals, griffins, and pointed arch openings, are Gothic. The building at Hope was designed at the time to accommodate boarders as well as day students, and was large enough to hold the whole school without difficulty. It now houses the administrative offices, staff room and sixth form classrooms. For over a hundred years, Simms Hall has been the core of the Jamaica College buildings, its strength and durability repeatedly demonstrated by its resistance to hurricanes and earthquakes, including the disastrous Kingston earthquake of 1907.

Scotland building
Erected in 1889 of brick, mortar, and wood, with iron detailing on the balcony railings, the Scotland building combines a variety of architectural styles including palladian windows on the west elevation, a lower arcaded wrap around verandah, and a steep-pitched cedar shingled hip roof. It was first used as a dormitory, and it now houses classrooms.

Assembly Hall
Constructed in 1913 of concrete block and steel, the Assembly Hall is wrapped by an arcaded verandah which helps to keep the interior cool. Its hipped roof of cedar shingles is partially concealed by parapet walls. It was originally used as an assembly hall, and it now houses classrooms.

The Chapel
The chapel was built in 1924. Its walls are constructed of reinforced concrete and concrete breather block. Along the north and south elevations a stepped roof creates a clerestory level for ventilation and diffused lighting. The east and west windows of the building are of stained glass. The west window is said to be a replica of St.Dunstan's window at Canterbury Cathedral in England. There is a war memorial which commemorates the memory of the 17 Jamaica College Old Boys who sacrificed their lives during the 1st World War.

Karl Hendrickson Auditorium
Since 2006, the Jamaica College Trust has embarked on a 5-year school improvement and renovation programme. One of the projects included the construction of a multi-purpose auditorium. Named after Hon. Dr. Karl Hendrickson, a Jamaica College alumnus who contributed heavily to the construction project, the new Christian auditorium is poised to host the school's formal events, including graduations, prize giving ceremonies, morning devotions, general assembly and theater and music productions. Jamaica College will now be able to comfortably host various indoor sporting events such as basketball, volleyball, badminton and table tennis in the 11,000 sqft structure.
The auditorium was opened on 22 November 2010.

The Phillip Gore Building
During the summer of 2011, four classrooms were refurbished and a fifth constructed on the Jamaica College campus. Because of the contributions of Phillip Gore to the construction of the classrooms, the building has been officially named "The Phillip Gore Building".

The building was dedicated to the school on 30 September 2011.

The Frank Hall Gym
A naturally lit and spacious gymnasium for the athletes of the Jamaica College was renovated and dedicated in 2013 in and named in honor of Olympian Frank Hall, Class of ‘53. The gym was fully stocked with a plethora of world class equipment all donated by the Jamaica College Old Boys of New York. While the Frank Hall Gym will primarily support the students who compete and represent Jamaica College in various sporting disciplines, the gym is open to the entire school population and serve as a platform to reinforce the importance of staying active and to establish a fitness routine.

Ashenheim Stadium
Jamaica College became the first high school in Jamaica to have its own stadium complex. The facility was commissioned in February 2019.

Academics

As a secondary school in Jamaica, Jamaica College follows the traditional English grammar school model used throughout the British West Indies, which incorporates the optional year 12 and 13, collectively known as sixth form. The first year of secondary school is regarded as first form, or year seven, and the subsequent year groups are numbered in increasing order up to sixth form. Students prepare for courses prescribed and administered by the Caribbean Examinations Council. Students in the upper sixth form (year thirteen) are prepared for their GCE A-level examinations, however the option exists to sit exams after completing lower sixth form (year 12).
The following table outlines the academic curriculum that exists at Jamaica College.

Rhodes Scholars
Since 1904, Jamaica College has had a rich history of producing Rhodes Scholars who have gone on to lead in various capacities both locally and internationally. To date, there have been 15 Rhodes Scholar recipients that attended Jamaica College.

Flight School
Jamaica College is the first English-speaking high school in the Caribbean to offer an aviation programme to its students. The course is being offered in partnership with a Jamaican company, The Flying Club and managed by Executive Director, David Robertson, Class of '78.
Since 2009, it operates under the Aircraft Training Organisation's (ATO) approval granted to The Flying Club by the Jamaica Civil Aviation Authority (JCAA) for a private pilot's licence ground school.

Robotics
On 1 December 2009, Jamaica College announced the establishment of a robotics programme and its entry in the FIRST Competition, the premier Robotics Competition in the United States for high school students. The Jamaica College Old Boys Association of New York, Inc., conceptualized the entire project and spearheaded the creation of the fully outfitted Robotics Lab at the school to promote practical applications of robotics adopted into the school's science education.

The JCOBA-NY also procured and shipped the FIRST robotics kit to JC, registered the "Griffins" as a New York based team in the FIRST Tech Challenge and arranged the team logistics to and from the tournament.

The precursor to the Robotics project was embedded in foundation work that was done and the foresight of the Jamaica College Old Boys Association of New York to build and equip the first computer lab at JC (circa 1990) which was enthusiastically embraced and endorsed by Principal Ruel Taylor. With an initial shipment of 80 computers, the first in the nation high school computer lab was up and running.

As a continuum of their first strategic project and main area of focus, over the years JCOBA-NY shipped hundreds of computers, monitors, smartboards, printers, projectors and related peripherals to JC valued at over half-million USD and counting.

The first entry for a Caribbean high school and a school outside the United States in the robotics field began before the 21st century.

Seamanship
The school continues to broaden the exposure to the students by entering into a memorandum of understanding with the Caribbean Maritime Institute of Jamaica to offer courses and career opportunities in the nautical industry.

STEAM Infusion Project
On January 27, 2021 the school launched its STEAM Infusion Project through the sponsorship and benevolence of Dr. Joseph Tait Class of '53. Dr. Tait is a member of the Jamaica College Old Boys Association of New York Chapter. This first in the nation USD 500,000 (JMD 72 million) signature initiative, with a clarion call of ‘Going Beyond Borders’, will infuse and integrate a culture of STEAM education into the Jamaica College academic curriculum. Building on the strategic and pioneering work of JCOBA-NY, the STEAM Infusion Project is a timely spark and technological foundation to deliver a world-class STEAM curricula at Jamaica College, thus heralding a pivotal interchange towards a 21st Century model for education in Jamaica. 
"It is easily the most significant financial contribution to our academic programme." ~Principal Wayne Robinson

Inclusive in the STEAM initiative, is the Dr. Joseph L. Tait Bursary Fund with initial funding of USD 50,000 (JMD 6.6 million). This scholarship fund will benefit talented and deserving Jamaica College Students and the first recipient was J’voughnn Blake, the outstanding student-athlete.

STEAM has its basis in the STEM learning initiative as well as adding Art as a component of the curriculum to stimulate creativity, beauty and technical proficiency.

Extracurricular
Extracurricular activities exist for all students and generally voluntary activities.

Activities

Cadet

The Jamaica College Cadet Unit (JCCU) is a member of the first battalion of the Jamaica Combined Cadet Force (JCCF). The unit has over 90 members. It is the headquarters company and one of the first cadet unit established in Jamaica under the Army and Air Cadet Force which was established on 1 November 1943.

Chapel Choir

The Jamaica College Chapel Choir.

Schools Challenge Quiz
Jamaica College actively participates as one of 64 high schools in TVJ's Schools Challenge Quiz. The school's lone victory came in 1987.

Chess
Jamaica College won the inter-schools team chess tournament four years straight between 1982-5.

Service Clubs

Key Club

Sports
Among the outdoor games, football and athletics are the most popular. The organisation of the sporting disciplines is facilitated via the House system. The students are assigned to one of eight houses upon entering Jamaica College. The houses are named after famous past principals of the school.

 Chambers
 Cowper
 DaCosta
 Drax
 Hardie
 Murray
 Musgrave
 Simms

Every year near to or at the end of the school year, there is a sporting competition among the Houses on a day called Sports Day. Football, track and field and basketball and also tennis are a few sports in which student compete to earn points for their houses. The winning house will be crowned champion until next years sports day, the team will also win medals.

Athletics
Annually, various high schools, athletic clubs and organisations compete in the Wata/Powerade/Jamaica College Track & Field Development Meet. , there has been 20 stagings of the Jamaica College Invitational. The meet, which serves as a qualifying event for the Boys' and Girls' Athletics Championships, is the first official meet on the JAAA local events calendar. The meet is sponsored by Wata and Powerade and is organised and hosted on the Jamaica College campus.

, the school has won the boys' title an overall 21 times at the Grace Kennedy and Company Limited-sponsored Inter-Secondary Schools Sports Association (ISSA) Boys' and Girls' Athletics Championships during the event's 101-year history.
The athletics team has maintained a promising showing over the recent years, consistently placing in the top five among all the participants.
The most recent victory has been achieved in the 2011 edition, making the school the current champions and holders of the Mortimer Geddes Trophy. On 2 April 2011, Jamaica College marked the 100th anniversary of their first ever title in 1911 with their first hold on the title since 2000. It was also the first year that the Decathlon and Javelin were contested at the championships, with both events being won by Jamaica College athletes.

The school takes part in the annual Penn Relays Carnival hosted annually since 21 April 1895 by the University of Pennsylvania. Jamaica College has continued to grow from strength to strength in the relay events as well as the field events on offer. , Jamaica College has earned five championship records since participation.

The Hugo Chambers 10K Road Race is a tribute to the late former Jamaica College headmaster and sports administrator, Hugo Chambers. The event takes place in the Liguanea/Papine area. The event is usually organised for October or November annually and includes ,  and  events.

Basketball

Jamaica College has been dubbed the school of basketball in Jamaica. Many of its titles were won in the late 1990s and early 2000s.
Jamaica College participates in the KFC-sponsored ISSA Schoolboy Basketball Competition as a member of the Southern Conference.

Cricket

The urban area secondary schools compete annually in the Grace Shield Schoolboy Cricket Competition, a Grace-sponsored schoolboy cricket competition.

Football

The ISSA Manning Cup Schoolboy Football Competition, was first played in Jamaica in 1909. Jamaica College won the Manning Cup for eight of the first nine years, losing only once in 1920. , Jamaica College has won 27 Manning Cup titles, making them the school with the most wins.

The ISSA/Pepsi/Digicel Schoolboy Walker Cup Knock-out Competition is a knock-out tournament of the top eight teams emerging from the first round of the Manning Cup competition. The number of teams and the knock-out nature of the competition allow for only three rounds of play; the quarter-final round, semi-final round then the final. The Walker Cup is held after the first round and before the inter-zone round of the Manning Cup. In 2009, after a century of schoolboy football history in Jamaica, Jamaica College attained their first hold on the Walker Cup.

The Sydney Olivier Interscholastic Challenge Shield is the oldest and most prestigious schoolboy football title in Jamaica. The Olivier Shied, as it is more commonly known, is a two-game playoff which symbolises schoolboy football supremacy as the Manning Cup Champions (who emerge from Jamaica's corporate area schools) are pitted against their rural area counterparts, the DaCosta Cup Champions.
Jamaica College have made good on their Olivier Shield acquisitions, having been able to obtain the trophy 75% of the time that they are Manning Cup Champions. , Jamaica College has won the Olivier Shield 18 times.
This record, when coupled with Jamaica College's win percentage in the Manning Cup, makes them the most successful high school in Jamaica.

In December 2010, Jamaica College completed a historic triple by winning all the Under-19 schoolboy football competitions on offer during a single season.
Consequently, Jamaica College was also successful in defending the Walker Cup in the 2010 season of football which meant that this was the first time in the school's history that Jamaica College were the title-holders of both urban area schoolboy football titles – the Manning and Walker Cups. With this milestone accomplishment, Jamaica College has won every schoolboy football title on offer except the Under-16 Colts title since 2005.

In 2014, telecommunications company LIME introduced to Jamaica the LIME Super Cup.
The event was marketed as the Champions League of Jamaican Schoolboy Football. In its inaugural year, Jamaica College won the tournament at the final played at Sabina Park in Kingston.

The under-19 football team was rewarded an accumulated JA$1M in prize money for their efforts and achievements. The funds are geared towards a school development programme.
There are several special football competitions that are played between traditional rival schools which are most often used as practice for the football season. Since 2004, the football teams of Jamaica College and Calabar High School compete in three age group categories namely the Under-14, Under-16, also known as Colts, and Under-19, that is, the Manning Cup team, along with a special old-boys over-35 match.
Both schools vie for the Keane-Crosskill Shield.
The competition was created in commemoration of two outstanding individuals – Dr. Keane, a Calabar Old Boy and Hugh Crosskill, a Jamaica College Old Boy who both died in 2004.

Field Hockey

Jamaica College competes in both the Under-16 and Under-19 divisions of the ISSA-sponsored JHF Hockey League. In 2011, Jamaica College became champions of the Under-19 division
and placed third in the Under-16. , Jamaica College is the 3-time Under-19 defending champions.

Insignia

School crest
The left half of the school's crest incorporates the red cross of England and the five golden pineapples that is to be found on Jamaica's Coat of Arms. The pineapple symbolizes justice, trust and honour, and each pineapple plant gives its own life to produce a single fruit. Around 1681, Sir Christopher Wren had begun using pineapple finials on churches and since then, the fruit has been recognized as a Christian symbol. The pine cone has a long-held imperial significance. The Romans placed pine cones on their buildings and monuments to symbolize confidence in the administrative, judicial and defensive power of the state. This cross therefore demonstrates the school's Christian background and allegiance and association to Jamaica.

There is an open book in the top right section of the shield to symbolise Bible truth, justice, and the importance of scholarly focus and academic pursuits. A golden griffin against a dark blue background completes the right half of the shield. The griffin, being the combination of the lion (king of beasts) and the eagle (most powerful and recognised bird of prey) represents the best of both creatures in terms of their characteristics and status – similar traits are to be displayed by each student.
Finally, the shield is surrounded by a scroll with the school's motto inscribed around the entire circumference.

Motto
The most commonly used form of the school motto is "Fervet opus in campis". In full, it is "Floreat collegium, fervet opus in campis". The complete Latin motto is literally translated as "May the college flourish, work is burning in the field". The inspiration for the school's motto stems from the harnessing of one's energy and motivation to enable success, especially in study. Students are taught that there must be the "fervet opus", that is figuratively, we must not only strike the iron while it is hot, but strike it till it is made hot. Following on this, a proverb states that "He who has heart has everything" ("che non arde non incende", who doth not burn doth not inflame). It is astonishing how much may be accomplished in self-culture by the energetic and the persevering, who are careful to avail themselves of opportunities, and use up the fragments of spare time which the idle permit to run to waste.

Prayer
The school prayer reflects the Christian beginnings of the school.

"Bless, O Lord, this College.
Create among us a spirit of comradeship and loyalty to one another.
When we are called to obey, let us obey with willingness.
When we are called to serve, let us serve with gladness.
When we are called to rule, make us rule with justice.
Drive away from us all ignorance and hardness of heart.
All things dishonorable and unclean.
And build us up in body mind and spirit.
Until we come to the full stature of the perfect man,
Jesus Christ our Lord, amen"

Mascot
Jamaica College has never had an official mascot although the griffin is almost always cited as one.

Nickname

The nickname "True Blue" or sometimes "The Dark Blues" is based on the school's official colour of navy blue. Alumni affirm their association with the school by proclaiming to be "True Blue" graduates, loosely associated with the English idiom meaning to be indubitably loyal or faithful.
More recently, the team of students who participate in FIRST's Robotics Competition have adopted "Gold Griffins" as a team name, a direct reference to the griffin which is found on the schools' crest.

Associations

Alumni Association
The Jamaica College Old Boys' Association (JCOBA) was established as a medium for alumni to continually support and represent Jamaica College. The JCOBA holds an annual meeting at the World Bank Building on the school's premises every November. For the Jamaica Chapter, the democratically elected board members convene on a monthly basis. There are other officially recognised chapters located in Toronto, Ontario, Canada, the state of Florida and New York City, New York.

Jamaica College Foundation
The Jamaica College Foundation was established in order to assist the school's administration and Board of Management. The mandate includes the creation and maintenance of a physical environment which features grounds, structures and facilities.

Parent-Teacher Association
The Jamaica College Parent-Teacher Association (PTA) provides the opportunity for parents and teachers to plan, report and interact on activities related to the interest of the school and the students. The PTA is involved in all aspects of school life. It contributes extensively to school activities, assists in physical improvements through projects, contributes significantly to the welfare programme that provides financial support to students, provides mentorship, assists in study sessions, and supports sports. The PTA also spearheads the Parent Representatives, where parents volunteer to serve as a liaison between the parents and teachers of each class.

Notable alumni
The school has produced numerous prominent members of Jamaican society including:

Academia 
 Prof. Gladstone E. Mills, O.J., C.D., professor emeritus in the Department of Government, University of the West Indies.
 Prof. Stuart Hall, professor emeritus of sociology at the Open University.

Arts, media and culture 
 Dennis Scott, playwright, poet, dancer, choreographer and actor (best known for appearances on The Cosby Show).
 Geoffrey Philp, writer.
 Glen Campbell, actor and comedian.
 John E. C. Hearne, novelist, journalist and teacher.
 Kwame Dawes, professor in English and Emmy Award-winning poet; author, musician and critic.
 Louis Marriott, playwright, actor, director and journalist.
 Michael G. Smith, poet and social anthropologist.
 Monty Alexander, internationally renowned Jazz pianist.

Business and finance 
 Derick M. Latibeaudiere, Bank of Jamaica Governor (1996–2009).

Politics and law 
 Bruce Golding, former Prime Minister of Jamaica from 2007 to 2011, leader of the Jamaica Labour Party.
 Douglas Saunders, Jamaican diplomat (currently Cabinet Secretary in the Jamaican Prime Minister's cabinet).
 Michael Manley, O.N., O.C.C., Prime Minister of Jamaica (1972–1980, 1989–1992).
 Norman W. Manley, M.M., Q.C., National Hero, Chief Minister of Jamaica (1955–1959), Premier of Jamaica (1959–1962).
 Noel Newton Nethersole, Jamaica's Finance Minister from 1955 to 1959
 Patrick L. Robinson, President of the International Criminal Tribunal for the Former Yugoslavia.
 Seymour Mullings, O.J., C.D., former Deputy Prime Minister of Jamaica (1993–2001).
 Dr. Richard Bernal, O.J., Jamaica's Ambassador to the United States.
 Eric Anthony Abrahams
 Peter Phillips (politician), Leader of Opposition 2017-2020
 Roy Black (attorney)

Sporting 

 James "Jimmy" Adams, former Jamaica and West Indies cricketer and Technical Director of the Jamaica Cricket Association (since 2008).
 Nicholas Addlery, Jamaica national football player.
 Bertrand Milbourne Clark, golf, cricket and tennis.
 Keammar Daley, Jamaica national football player.
 Fabian Dawkins, Jamaica national football player.
 Jerome Jordan, professional basketball player.
 Nick Richards, professional basketball player similar to Jerome Jordan.

Notable staff
Notable staff of the school include:

 Dennis Ziadie, Under-19 (Manning Cup) football coach (1970–1975).
 Derek Alton Walcott, OBE, O.C.C., renowned Saint Lucian poet, playwright, writer and visual artist who was awarded the Nobel Prize in Literature; taught at Jamaica College 1953–1957.

Headmasters

The following lists present the principals of Jamaica College during its entire history.

Drax Free School, Jamaica Free School and Jamaica High School (1789–1885)

Jamaica College (1885 onwards)

† indicates principals who attended Jamaica College

See also
 Education in Jamaica
 High School Football Champions in Jamaica
 List of Schools in Jamaica

References

External links

Official
 
 The Jamaica College Foundation

Old Boys Associations
 Jamaica College Old Boys Association, Jamaica Chapter
 Jamaica College Old Boys Association, Canada Chapter
 Jamaica College Old Boys Association, Florida Chapter
 Jamaica College Old Boys Association, New York Chapter

General information
 WikiMapia – Jamaica College
 Jamaica College Soccer

Schools in Kingston, Jamaica
Boys' schools in Jamaica
Drax family
Educational institutions established in 1789
1789 establishments in the British Empire